Conquest of Cochise is a 1953 American Western film set in 1853 at the time of the Gadsen Purchase. Produced by Sam Katzman and directed by William Castle, it stars John Hodiak, Robert Stack and Joy Page.

Plot
Army Major Tom Burke is assigned to lead four troops of cavalry dragoons into Tucson in the Gadsden Purchase, recently acquired by the United States from Mexico. Both the Apache, led by Cochise, and Comanche Indian tribes are at war with the Mexican population. In addition to the three stakeholders, Major Burke faces a treacherous businessman whose profits from selling alcohol to all parties is threatened by the prospect of peace.

Cast
 John Hodiak (in brownface) as Cochise
 Robert Stack as Maj. Tom Burke
 Joy Page as Consuelo de Cordova
 Rico Alaniz as Felipe
 Fortunio Bonanova as Mexican Minister
 Edward Colmans as Don Francisco de Cordova
 Alex Montoya as Jose Garcia
 Steven Ritch as Tukiwah
 Carol Thurston as Terua
 Rodd Redwing as Red Knife
 Robert Griffin as Sam Maddock (as Robert E. Griffin)
 Poppy del Vando as Señora de Cordova

Production
The film was shot at Santa Clarita, California, Corriganville movie ranch and the Vasquez Rocks Natural Area Park in Agua Dulce, California.

William Castle says Katzman insisted Indians wear bathing caps to indicate they had shaved their heads in order to save money.

References

External links

 
 
 }
 

1953 films
1953 Western (genre) films
American Western (genre) films
Western (genre) cavalry films
Apache Wars films
Films set in Tucson, Arizona
Films set in 1853
Films shot in Los Angeles County, California
Columbia Pictures films
Films directed by William Castle
1950s English-language films
1950s American films